The Clinical Centre of Kragujevac (abbr. КЦК / KCK) is a medical centre located in Kragujevac, Serbia. It serves as the main medical centre for both Kragujevac and Šumadija and Western Serbia.

History
The Clinical Centre of Kragujevac was established on 3 March 2005. It is one of four medical centers in Serbia and serves more than 2 million people mostly from Šumadija and Western Serbia.

Organization
The Clinical Centre of Kragujevac contains 37 organisational units, of which 15 are clinics, 7 centers and 15 service units. The complex also houses the University of Kragujevac Faculty Of Medicine. As of 2017, the Clinical Centre has a capacity of 1,118 beds and has more than 2,200 employees.

See also
 Healthcare in Serbia
 List of hospitals in Serbia

References

External links
 Official website

Hospitals in Serbia
Hospitals established in 2005
2005 establishments in Serbia
Buildings and structures in Kragujevac